Peter Rögle (born 6 March 1957) is a German former water polo player who competed in the 1976 Summer Olympics, in the 1984 Summer Olympics, in the 1988 Summer Olympics, and in the 1992 Summer Olympics. He was born in Berlin.

See also
 Germany men's Olympic water polo team records and statistics
 List of Olympic medalists in water polo (men)
 List of men's Olympic water polo tournament goalkeepers
 List of World Aquatics Championships medalists in water polo

References

External links
 

1957 births
Living people
Water polo goalkeepers
Water polo players from Berlin
German male water polo players
Olympic water polo players of West Germany
Water polo players at the 1976 Summer Olympics
Water polo players at the 1984 Summer Olympics
Water polo players at the 1988 Summer Olympics
Water polo players at the 1992 Summer Olympics
Olympic bronze medalists for West Germany
Olympic medalists in water polo
Medalists at the 1984 Summer Olympics
Recipients of the Order of Merit of Berlin